The office of Governor of Västra Götaland County was created in 1998, where the counties Älvsborg County, Gothenburg and Bohus County and Skaraborg County merged.

List of officeholders

Footnotes

References

Vastra Gotaland